The Des Moines Police Department is the municipal police department for the city of Des Moines, Iowa. The department is the largest law enforcement agency in the state of Iowa.

History 
On January 21, 1896, the size of Des Moines increased significantly when state legislature granted the city a new charter allowing it to absorb the eight towns surrounding the city. As the size of the city increased, the need for public safety increased. In 1908 the city auditor issued an annual report of the city which stated appointed the Chief of Police. By the turn of the 19th century the police department was loosely structured and consisted of a patrol division and administration division. The patrol division consisted of patrol officers and detectives while the administration division consisted of jail staff.

The Des Moines Police Department saw a decrease in the number of public disorder arrests between 1910-1920, which is attributed to the fact that in 1911 patrol officers began patrolling in automobiles and were less likely to observe public disorder incidents.

Department Arrest Statistics from 1900-1970 (* per 1,000 population)

Organizational structure 
The Des Moines Police Department consists of three separate divisions.
 Administrative Services Division
 Operations Division 
 The division consists of the Patrol Services Bureau and the Homeland Security Bureau. The Homeland Security Bureau includes Airport Security, Bomb Squad, Fusion Center, and Metro Special Tactics and Response.
 Investigations Division
 The division consists of the Detective Bureau.

Substation 
In addition to the police department headquarters, the Des Moines Police Department also has a substation located at 1222 24th St, Des Moines, Iowa. The substation houses the Des Moines Police Department Traffic Unit.

November 2016 shooting 

On November 2, 2016, Des Moines Police Department Officer Sergeant Anthony Beminio and Urbandale Police Department Officer Justin Martin were killed in ambush-style shootings near Des Moines. The shooting received national attention as President Barack Obama described the killings as “shameful acts of violence," and continued on to say “Sgt. Anthony Beminio and Officer Justin Martin represented our best, most decent instincts as human beings — to serve our neighbors, to put ourselves in harm’s way for someone else.”  The lone suspect, Scott Michael Greene, was quickly identified and apprehended by the Dallas County Sheriff's Office and the Iowa State Patrol the same day.

Fallen officers 
In the history of the Des Moines Police Department, 23 officers and 1 K9 unit have been killed in the line of duty.

References 

Government of Des Moines, Iowa
Municipal police departments of Iowa